The Rail Bridge over the Iset River - is an experimental bridge over the Iset River is a unique engineering structure made according to the advanced technology of the late 1930s in Kamensk-Uralsky, Sverdlovsk oblast.

The building was granted the status of regional significance on the 28th of December 2001 (the Sverdlovsk oblast Government Decree № 859). The object number of cultural heritage of regional significance is 661710946850005.

Architecture 
In 1934 the construction of the Ural Aluminum Plant began. To support the plant, the Yekaterinburg-Shadrinsk-Kurgan railway line running through Kamensk, but located north of the plant at a considerable distance, was used. By 1938 a project was developed for supplying vehicles through a single-span arched railway bridge.

The bridge was designed by a Moscow engineer, Professor VA Rosnovsky. The professor conducted scientific research in the field of designing of pipe-concrete bridges (for the design and construction of the railway bridge in Kamensk-Uralsky was awarded the Order of the Red Banner of Labor).

The railway bridge is located on the eighth kilometer of the Sinarska-Chelyabinsk railway line in the city of Kamensk-Uralsky.

Construction work was carried out from 1938 to 1940. The length of the span of the bridge was 140 meters, the length of the coastal overpass: the left - 56 meters, the right - 42 meters, the boom - 22 meters. It was built by the Mostotrest organization, the manufacture of metal structures and assembly welding were made by the Verkhnaya Salda factory.

During the construction, a new technology was used at that time - pipe-concrete, the filling of steel pipes with concrete. A constructive scheme was used with the use of a two-hinged arch (externally the bridge is similar to the Konstantinovsky bridge across the Dnieper in the city of Zaporozhye).

References

Literature 
 
 Памятники архитектуры Каменска-Уральского / С. И. Гаврилова, Л. В. Зенкова, А. В. Кузнецова, А. Ю. Лесунова — Екатеринбург: Банк культурной информации, 2008. — 92 с.
 

Tourist attractions in Sverdlovsk Oblast
Buildings and structures in Kamensk-Uralsky
Cultural heritage monuments in Kamensk-Uralsky
Cultural heritage monuments of regional significance in Sverdlovsk Oblast